Fairview is an unincorporated community in Cotton Township, Switzerland County, in the U.S. state of Indiana.

History
An old variant name of the community was called Sugar Branch. A post office was established under this name in 1835, was renamed to Fairview in 1911, and operated until it was discontinued in 1935.

Geography

References

Unincorporated communities in Switzerland County, Indiana
Unincorporated communities in Indiana